Armutlu or Armudlu may refer to:

Places

Armenia 
 Tandzut, Armavir, formerly Armutlu, a town in the Armavir Province
 Tufashen, formerly Armutlu, a town in the Shirak Province

Azerbaijan 
 Armudlu, Kalbajar, a village in the Kalbajar Rayon
 Armudlu, Qakh, a village in the Qakh Rayon
 Armudlu, Qubadli, a village in the Qubadli Rayon
 Armudlu, Shusha, a village in the Shusha Rayon

Bulgaria 
 Armutlu, former name of Krushari, a village and municipality in Dobrich Province

Iran 
 Armudlu, Iran, a village in North Khorasan Province
 Armutlu, Iran, a village in Zanjan Province

Romania

 Turda, formerly Armutlia, a village in Mihai Bravu commune, Tulcea County
 Periș, formerly Armutlia, a former village in Independenţa commune, Constanța County

Turkey 
 Armutlu, Aksaray, a village in the central district of Aksaray Province
 Armutlu, Aydın, a village in the central district of Aydın Province
 Armutlu, Bayburt, a village in the central district of Bayburt Province
 Armutlu, Çay, a village in the Çay district of Afyonkarahisar Province
 Armutlu, Çermik
 Armutlu, Elmalı, a village in the Elmalı district of Antalya Province
 Armutlu, Gönen, a village
 Armutlu, İspir
 Armutlu, Kemalpaşa, a town in the Kemalpaşa district of İzmir Province
 Armutlu, Kepsut, a village
 Armutlu, Kozluk, a village in the Kozluk district of Batman Province
 Armutlu, Suluova, a village in the Suluova district of Amasya Province
 Armutlu, Yalova, a town and district in Yalova Province

Landform
 Armutlu Peninsula, Marmara Sea in Turkey